Ken LaZebnik (original Czech surname Lazebník) (born November 11, 1954) is an American writer, best known for his work in television, film, and theatre. His work has appeared in films such as A Prairie Home Companion and in television shows Touched by an Angel and Star Trek: Enterprise. LaZebnik's screenplay On the Spectrum earned him a Steinberg Award from the  American Theatre Critics Association.

LaZebnik is the founder and director of the Master of Fine Arts in TV and Screenwriting program at Stephens College, a low residency program based in Hollywood. He is also the author of the 2014 book Hollywood Digs: An Archeology of Shadows, a collection of essays about personal encounters with Hollywood history.

Career

Television and film

LaZebnik has an extensive career writing for film and television. For eight years he wrote for Touched By An Angel, an American supernatural drama series distributed by CBS. He is also credited with writing three specials for the PBS In Concert at the White House series. Additional television credits include being a contributing writer for Army Wives, Providence, Star Trek: Enterprise, and the Hallmark Channel series When Calls the Heart.

LaZebnik was the writer for Thomas Kinkade's Christmas Cottage a Lionsgate film released in 2008 which starred Peter O'Toole and Marcia Gay Harden. He also has a shared story credit with Garrison Keillor on the film A Prairie Home Companion, directed by Robert Altman.

Theater

LaZebnik's work also include eleven plays produced throughout the United States. He has written two plays on the subject of baseball, both of which were commissioned by the Mixed Blood Theatre Company and directed by its artistic director Jack Reuler. The first play, Calvinisms, was a one-man show about former Minnesota Twins owner Calvin Griffith. The second, League of Nations, is a fictional story set in a bullpen in the midst of a multi-cultural divide.

LaZebnik has written three plays dealing with autism which have had runs at the Mixed Blood Theatre Company. His play On the Spectrum premiered at the theatre and was awarded a Steinberg Citation from the American Theatre Critics Association. It later had a successful run in Los Angeles at the Fountain Theatre. Theory of The Mind was commissioned for young audiences by the Cincinnati Playhouse in the Park and has also been produced in Minnesota, Hawaii and Michigan. Vestibular Sense was LaZebnik's first play written with a theme and characters centered around autism.

LaZebnik's most recent work, Rachel Calof, was chosen to be performed at the 2015 United Solo Festival in New York City. Rachel Calof is a one-woman show adapted from the memoir of a Jewish homesteader in North Dakota and stars Kate Fuglei.

Other works include African Jazz, The Garden of Joy, Harlem Renaissance Revue, Sink Eating and Black Magic which he co-wrote with Jack Reuler and Bob DeFlores.

Books and journals

In 1981, LaZebnik founded The Minneapolis Review of Baseball, a quarterly journal of writing on baseball. It featured baseball fiction, poetry, history, and editorials on the game.  Authors who wrote for the magazine included Garrison Keillor, Sen. Eugene McCarthy, Steve Lehman, and Bart Schneider. An anthology was published in 1989: The Best of the Minneapolis Review of Baseball.  LaZebnik and Steve Lehman also collaborated on a children's baseball ABC book, A Is For At Bat. LaZebnik has written about baseball for The New York Times, Manhattan, inc., and City Pages.

LaZebnik's latest book is Hollywood Digs:  An Archaeology of Shadows, published by Kelly's Cove Press in 2014. It is a collection of essays about personal encounters with shards of Hollywood history, including profiles of stuntman/actor Jock Mahoney, the real-life "Gidget," writer Melville Shavelson, and essays on pieces of Hollywood history, such as F. Scott Fitzgerald's tenancy on the San Fernando Valley estate of film butler Edward Everett Horton.

Academia

LaZebnik is the founder and director of the Master of Fine Arts in TV and Screenwriting program at Stephens College, a low residency program based in Hollywood. The program is geared more towards women, but is open to both men and women. Students are paired with a mentor in screenwriting for both television and film, with a goal of boosting the number of women who work in the film industry. The program sends students to Jim Henson Company Studios for 10 days each semester. Partial funding for the program came from Alex Trebek, a friend of LaZebnik, who endowed a chair in the program for screenwriting. Prior to Stephens, LaZebnik worked as an adjunct professor at Pepperdine University since 2010. LaZebnik is currently the Director of the TV Writers Studio (TVWS) at Long Island University in Brooklyn, New York.

Published works

Select film and television credits

Select theatre credits

Bibliography

References

External links 
 Ken LaZebnik official website
 

American television writers
American male television writers
1954 births
Living people
Screenwriters from Pennsylvania
People from Levittown, Pennsylvania